Dibamus tiomanensis, or the Tioman Island blind lizard, is a legless lizard endemic to Tioman Island in Malaysia. These lizards can reach  in snout–vent length. A distinguishing characteristic of this species is that they are brown in color with a lighter brown/tan color on their snout and jaw.

References

tiomanensis
Reptiles of Malaysia
Endemic fauna of Malaysia
Reptiles described in 2004
Taxa named by Raul E. Diaz
Taxa named by Tzi Ming Leong
Taxa named by Larry Lee Grismer
Taxa named by Norsham S. Yaakob